Großer Binnensee is a lake in Kreis Plön, Schleswig-Holstein, Germany.

Lakes of Schleswig-Holstein
LGrosserBinnensee